Ajay Bhardwaj (Punjabi: ਅਜੇ ਭਾਰਦਵਾਜ, born 1964) is an Indian-Punjabi documentary filmmaker, not to be confused with the billionaire founder of Anthem Biosciences.

Biography
He completed BA Honors in Political Science from University of Delhi in 1986.

He holds an MA degree in political science from Jawaharlal Nehru University and an MA degree in Mass Communication from Jamia Millia Islamia. Currently he is a pursuing PhD in Asian Studies from the University of British Columbia, Vancouver.

Career
He started his television career as assistant director with a popular Muppet show for pre school children, Tarramtoo in 1990. He went on to direct and produce a variety of programs like election analysis, game show, talk show, and popular science show with television companies such as NDTV, Times Television, TV-18 and Eenadu news channel. One of his well-known programmes is "Turning Point", a popular science show hosted by Girish Karnad.

He has been making documentaries from 1997 with his first documentary being Ek Minute Ka Maun about the martyrdom of the former President of Jawaharlal Nehru University's student union, Chandrashekhar Prasad.

He major work has been the documentary trilogy about Indian Punjab, Kitte Mil Ve Mahi, Rabba Hun Kee Kariye and Milange Babey Ratan De Mele Te.

Filmography
Ek Minute Ka Maun (A Minute of Silence)
Kitte Mil Ve Mahi (Where the Twain Shall Meet)
Rabba Hun Kee Kariye (Thus Departed Our Neighbours)
Milange Babey Ratan De Mele Te (Let's Meet at Baba Ratan's Fair)
Of Land, Labour And Love
...So Shall You Reap
Manipur under The Shadow Of AFSPA
Sanitation for All – A Beginning Made
Walking Together
Road to Revival: The Invincible Spirit of People of Kuchchh
Wave of Success

Honors and awards
 Public Scholar Initiative Award, UBC (2015 and 2016)
 Faculty of Arts Graduate Award, UBC (2014)

References

External links
 Official website

Indian documentary filmmakers
1964 births
Living people